This is a list of films considered "Oscar bait" that have failed to receive any Oscar nominations.

Background
A study by Gabriel Rossman and Oliver Schilke, two sociologists at the University of California, Los Angeles (UCLA), reviewed data from the Internet Movie Database (IMDb), such as genres and plot keywords, for 3,000 movies released between 1985 and 2009 to see what elements were likeliest to draw Oscar nominations. The researchers found that war movies, historical epics, and biographies earned the most. Plot elements of political intrigue, disabilities, war crimes and show business were also very common elements of nominated films. A release during Oscar season, or by an independent division of a major studio were also strong indicators. The study found that some keywords had a strongly negative correlation with Oscar nominations, such as "zombie", "breast implant" and "black independent film".

According to the study, the movie that scored the highest and thus was the most blatant Oscar bait among the films surveyed was Alan Parker's 1990 Come See the Paradise, released by 20th Century Fox. It received that score for the previous Oscar nominations of Parker, its setting in Hollywood (star Dennis Quaid plays a projectionist) and its depiction of a tragic historical event (his Japanese American wife and children are interned) against the background of war and racism. It was only released in a few cities during the last week of that year to make it eligible for the awards. However, it was not nominated for any.

Second and third were The Lord of the Rings: The Return of the King, the 2003 Best Picture winner, and The People vs. Larry Flynt, released in 1996. At the low end, as the movie in that period which least qualified as Oscar bait, was the 2006 remake of When a Stranger Calls, which indeed was not nominated for any Oscars. It was followed by 2009's Hotel for Dogs and Barbershop 2: Back in Business, from 2004.

Decades

1990s
 Come See the Paradise (1990)
 Beautiful Girls (1996)
 The Pallbearer (1996)
 Patch Adams (1998)

2000s
 Finding Forrester (2000)
 Men of Honor (2000)
 Pay It Forward (2000)
 The Majestic (2001)
 The Shipping News (2001)
 Confessions of a Dangerous Mind (2002)
The Life of David Gale (2003)
Radio (2003)
 Alexander (2004)
 The Three Burials of Melquiades Estrada (2005)
 All The King's Men (2006)
 Bobby (2006)
 The Painted Veil (2006)
 Reservation Road (2007)
 Zodiac (2007)
 Seven Pounds (2008)
 Amelia (2009)
 Lions for Lambs (2009)
 The Soloist (2009)

2010s
 Conviction (2010)
 J. Edgar (2011)
 The Butler (2013)
 Diana (2013)
 The Fifth Estate (2013)
 Jobs (2013)
 Rush (2013)
 Men, Women & Children (2014)
 The Monuments Men (2014)
 Serena (2014)
 Concussion (2015)
 In the Heart of the Sea (2015)
 Ricki and the Flash (2015)
 Allied (2016)
 American Pastoral (2016)
 Billy Lynn's Long Halftime Walk (2016)
 The Birth of a Nation (2016)
 Collateral Beauty (2016)
 Denial (2016)
 Rules Don't Apply (2016)
 Snowden (2016)
 Battle of the Sexes (2017)
 Detroit (2017)
 Last Flag Flying (2017)
 Suburbicon (2017)
 Beautiful Boy (2018)
 Ben Is Back (2018)
 Boy Erased (2018)
 The Front Runner (2018)
 The Happy Prince (2018)
 The Mule (2018)
 Peterloo (2018)
 Widows (2018)
 Cats (2019)
 Lucy in the Sky (2019)

2020s
 The Invisible Man (2020)
 Dear Evan Hansen (2021)
 Joe Bell (2021)
 The Last Duel (2021)
 Music (2021)
 Respect (2021)
 The Tender Bar (2021)
 The Unforgivable (2021)
 A Man Called Otto (2022)
 Amsterdam (2022)
 Armageddon Time (2022)
 Devotion (2022)
 Emancipation (2022)
 The Good Nurse (2022)
 My Policeman (2022)
 She Said (2022)
 The Son (2022)
 Till (2022)
 The Woman King (2022)

References

See also
Oscar season
Prestige picture
Message picture

Academy Awards
1990s in film
2000s in film
2010s in film
2020s in film
Academy Awards lists